Arthur Ferdinand Adam Schmitt (27 November 1910 – 30 September 1989) was a German gymnast. He competed in eight events at the 1952 Summer Olympics, representing Saar.

See also
 Saar at the 1952 Summer Olympics

References

External links
 

1910 births
1989 deaths
German male artistic gymnasts
Olympic gymnasts of Saar
Gymnasts at the 1952 Summer Olympics
Sportspeople from Saarbrücken
20th-century German people